Ismael El Massoudi (born 5 May 1978) is a French boxer with Moroccan roots. He won the interim WBA welterweight on French National Day, July 14, 2011, in Marrakech, Morocco, at the famous marketplace of Jamaâ El Fna, against Souleymane M'baye, elevating his record to 36 wins (14 KO's) and 3 losses. He is 5' 7" tall and lives in Puy-de-Dôme in the French department of Clermont-Ferrand. He is born on May 5, 1978, and the orthodox boxer's nickname is "La tempête du désert", which means "Desert Storm".

Professional boxing record 

|-
| style="text-align:center;" colspan="8"|37 Wins (12 knockouts), 5 Losses
|-  style="text-align:center; background:#e3e3e3;"
|  style="border-style:none none solid solid; "|Res.
|  style="border-style:none none solid solid; "|Record
|  style="border-style:none none solid solid; "|Opponent
|  style="border-style:none none solid solid; "|Type
|  style="border-style:none none solid solid; "|Round, Time
|  style="border-style:none none solid solid; "|Date
|  style="border-style:none none solid solid; "|Location
|  style="border-style:none none solid solid; "|Notes
|- align=center
|Loss||37–5||align=left| Leonard Bundu
|
|
|
|align=left|
|align=left|
|- align=center
|Win||37–4||align=left| Arek Malek
|
|
|
|align=left|
|align=left|
|- align=center
|Loss||36–4||align=left| Diego Gabriel Chaves
|
|
|
|align=left|
|align=left|
|- align=center
|Win||36–3||align=left| Souleymane M'baye
|
|
|
|align=left|
|align=left|

References

External links

1978 births
Living people
French sportspeople of Moroccan descent
Sportspeople from Clermont-Ferrand
Welterweight boxers
French male boxers